Television in Syria was formed in 1960, when Syria and Egypt (which adopted television that same year) were part of the United Arab Republic. It broadcast in black and white until 1976. In 1985 a second channel was established and in 1995 Syrian television rented a channel on Arabsat and it started broadcasting eight hours daily via satellite in 1996. Syrian channels are mostly owned and controlled by the Syrian Arab Television and Radio Broadcasting Commission (SATRBC) which is connected to the Ministry of Information. It has 4,800 staff; both government employees and freelancers.

Since the start of the Syrian Civil War in 2011, the state has been engaging in a "media war" to combat the criticisms broadcast from other popular media outlets viewed in the Arab World and internationally, such as Al Arabiya and Al Jazeera. Syrian television coverage champions the government against rebel forces such as Al-Nusra Front, Free Syrian Army and the Islamic Front. According to BBC Arabic, it also tends to omit or downplay reports of civilian casualties in its coverage of confrontations with "terrorist" groups. The Arab League officially asked the satellite operators Arabsat and Nilesat to stop broadcasting Syrian media in June 2012. On April 27, 2013, Al Jazeera Media Network announced that it was suspending indefinitely its activities throughout Syria because of alleged intimidation and threats against its staff.

List of channels

Satellite channels
Addounia TV (defunct)
Arrai TV (defunct)
Cham TV (defunct)
Lana TV 
Lana Plus TV 
El Khabar TV 
Massaya TV
Sama TV
SATRBC
Noor Al-Sham
Syria TV
Syrian Drama TV
Syrian Education TV
Syrian Medical TV (defunct)
Syrian News Channel
Talaqie TV (defunct)
Spacetoon (shut down in Syria)

Regional channels
Rojava TV (Kurdish)
Ronahî TV (Kurdish)
Manbij Tv (Kurdish) (defunct)
 Nosor TV (defunct)
 Syria Baladna (defunct)

Terrestrial channels
Channel 1 (Arabic focus) (defunct)
Channel 2 (Sport, family and health focus including regional variants) (defunct)

Rebel media

Satellite channels
Syrian Television
Orient TV
Syria al-shaab
Suriya al-Ghad
Aleppo Today
Al-Jisr TV

References

 
Mass media in Syria
Arabic-language television stations